Apollo 18 may refer to:

 One of the canceled Apollo missions of the American Apollo lunar program of the 1960s
 The officially unnumbered Apollo spacecraft used in the 1975 Apollo–Soyuz Test Project
 The fictional Apollo 18 mission in James Michener's 1982 novel Space
 Apollo 18: Mission to the Moon, a 1988 video game by Accolade
 Apollo 18 (album), a 1992 album by They Might Be Giants
 Apollo 18 (band), a Korean indie rock trio, formed in 2008
 Apollo 18 (film), a 2011 horror film directed by Gonzalo López-Gallego
 The fictional Apollo 18 mission in Chris Hadfield's 2021 novel The Apollo Murders

Canceled Apollo missions